The 2004 Seattle Seahawks season was the franchise's 29th season in the National Football League (NFL), the third season in Qwest Field and the 6th under head coach Mike Holmgren. Finishing the season at 9–7, the Seahawks were unable to replicate the year they had prior.

This was the first of four consecutive NFC West titles for the Seahawks. In the Wild Card round, they faced off against the divisional rival St. Louis Rams, who swept them 2–0 in the regular season. Seattle looked to avenge on their two losses, but it was too late as Matt Hasselbeck's game-tying drive to Bobby Engram was incomplete, leading Hasselbeck to his knees and punch the turf in frustration. The Seahawks would go on to lose 20–27. The Rams, despite a mediocre 8–8 record, advanced to the Divisional round the following week, only to lose to Michael Vick's Atlanta Falcons in a 47–17 blowout.

On October 20, 2004, the Seahawks traded a conditional 2005 7th round pick (condition failed) to the Oakland Raiders in exchange for Jerry Rice.

Draft

Final roster

 Starters in bold.
 (*) Denotes players that were selected for the 2005 Pro Bowl.

Schedule

Preseason

Source: Seahawks Media Guides

Regular season
Divisional matchups have the NFC West playing the NFC South and the AFC East.

Source: 2004 NFL season results

Postseason

Standings

Game Summaries

Preseason

Week P1: at Green Bay Packers

Week P2: vs. Denver Broncos

Week P3: at San Diego Chargers

Week P4: vs. Minnesota Vikings

Regular season

Week 1: at New Orleans Saints

The Seahawks won for only the seventh time in their last eighteen road games, holding Aaron Brooks to one touchdown while forcing two New Orleans fumbles.

Week 2: at Tampa Bay Buccaneers

The Seahawks defeated the Buccaneers 10–6 despite recording only nine first downs and being shut out in the second half. The Seahawks intercepted Brad Johnson and Chris Simms and limited the Bucs to just 271 total yards.

Week 3: vs. San Francisco 49ers

The Seahawks home opener was a 34–0 shutout of the 49ers where they intercepted Ken Dorsey twice and limited the Niners to just 175 yards. It was San Francisco's first shutout loss since losing to the Atlanta Falcons 0-7 in 1977.

Week 5: vs. St. Louis Rams

The Seahawks suffered their first home loss since 2002. The Rams were bullied in the first half and fell behind 24–7, but in the second half Marc Bulger threw two touchdowns as the Rams outscored Seattle 20–3; tied 27–27 the game went to overtime and Bulger threw three passes – the last a 52-yard score to Shaun McDonald and the 33–27 Rams win.

Week 6: at New England Patriots

A week after losing to one participant in Super Bowl XXXVI the Seahawks fell to that game's winner as the Patriots reached a league-record 20th consecutive win (regular and postseason) 30–20. Matt Hasselbeck, a former Patriots ball boy whose dad Don Hasselbeck played in Foxboro alongside Steve Grogan, threw for 349 yards but was intercepted twice.

Week 7: at Arizona Cardinals
{{Americanfootballbox
 |titlestyle=;text-align:center;
 |state=autocollapse
 |title= Week Seven: Seattle Seahawks at Arizona Cardinals – Game summary
 |date=October 24
 |time=1:16pm local
 |road=Seahawks
 |R1=0|R2=3|R3=7|R4=7
 |home=Cardinals'
 |H1=7|H2=6|H3=3|H4=9
 |stadium=Sun Devil Stadium, Tempe, Arizona
 |attendance=35,695
 |weather=clear, 30% humidity, wind calm
 |referee=Bill Vinovich
 |TV=Fox
 |TVAnnouncers=Spero Dedes, Erik Kramer and Kevin McCabe
 |reference=Gamecenter, Gamebook
 |scoring=First quarter ARI – Larry Fitzgerald 25-yard pass from Josh McCown (Neil Rackers kick), 8:23 (ARI 7–0)Second quarter SEA – Josh Brown 54-yard field goal, 6:28 (ARI 7–3)
 ARI – Neil Rackers 55-yard field goal, 3:01 (ARI 10–3)
 ARI – Neil Rackers 55-yard field goal, 1:01 (ARI 13–3)Third quarter ARI – Neil Rackers 50-yard field goal, 2:50 (ARI 16–3)
 SEA – Darrell Jackson 1-yard pass from Matt Hasselbeck (Josh Brown kick), 0:05 (ARI 16–10)Fourth quarter SEA – Ken Lucas 21-yard interception return (Josh Brown kick), 13:07 (SEA 17–16)
 ARI – Safety, Donnie Jones blocked punt out of end zone, 8:50 (ARI 18–17)
 ARI – Emmitt Smith 23-yard run (Neil Rackers kick), 1:53 (ARI 25–17)
 |stats=Top passers SEA – Matt Hasselbeck: 14/41, 187 yds, 1 TD, 4 INT
 ARI – Josh McCown: 22/36, 212 yds, 1 TD, 1 INTTop rushers SEA – Shaun Alexander: 12 car, 65 yds
 ARI – Emmitt Smith: 26 car, 106 yds, 1 TDTop receivers SEA – Darrell Jackson: 8 rec, 109 yds, 1 TD
 ARI – Larry Fitzgerald: 4 rec, 73 yds, 1 TDTeam' –  –  –  – 
 SEA – 180 – 77 – 257 – 4
 ARI – 189 – 127 – 316 – 2
}}
Playing in Sun Devil Stadium the Seahawks' previous road woes resumed with four interceptions thrown by Matt Hasselbeck and the Seahawks limited to just 257 total yards in a 25–17 loss. Seattle erased a 16–3 gap (the go-ahead score came when Ken Lucas picked off Josh McCown and ran back a 21-yard score) but gave up a safety, then gave up a 23-yard touchdown by Emmitt Smith in the fourth quarter.

Week 8: vs. Carolina Panthers

Against the defending NFC champion Panthers the Seahawks erupted to 237 rushing yards and a 23–17 win. Shaun Alexander accounted for 195 rushing yards and a touchdown.

Week 9: at San Francisco 49ers

Despite seven penalties for 55 yards the Seahawks shot down the 49ers at Candlestick Park 42–27, rushing for 184 yards and two touchdowns alongside 285 yards and three scores from Matt Hasselbeck. The Seahawks ended the game when they intercepted Tim Rattay and ran back a 23-yard score in the fourth.

Week 10: at St. Louis Rams

At St. Louis the Rams won a battle of field goals 23–12, limiting Hasselbeck to just 172 yards. Hasselbeck was knocked out of the game.

Week 11: vs. Miami Dolphins

The Dolphins rallied from down 17–7 to tie the game, but in the fourth Michael Boulware picked off A. J. Feeley and ran back a 63-yard touchdown. Trent Dilfer started instead of Matt Hasselbeck and managed a touchdown to Jerry Rice in the 24–17 Seahawks win; the score was Rice’s first of the season after being traded to Seattle from the Raiders.

Week 12: vs. Buffalo Bills

The 6–4 Seahawks hosted the 4–6 Bills and Willis McGahee exploded to four touchdowns in a 38–9 Buffalo rout. Drew Bledsoe was intercepted three times but managed a touchdown to Lee Evans.

Week 13: vs. Dallas Cowboys

Hosting Monday Night Football'' the Seahawks' roller-coaster of a season continued as they fell to 6–6 to the now-5-7 Cowboys. The Hawks led 14–3 after one quarter, but in the second and third the Cowboys scored 26 points (botching a two-point attempt after Vinny Testaverde's touchdown to Terrance Copper). In the fourth Matt Hasselbeck (414 total yards) erupted to three touchdown drives, two of them ending in Shaun Alexander rushes, a 19-yard score to Jerheme Urban, and a two-point conversion to Darrell Jackson, but the Seahawks could not hold on to a 39–29 lead; Testaverde found Keyshawn Johnson for a 34-yard touchdown with 1:54 to go; the Cowboys kicked onsides and recovered, then four Julius Jones rushes ended in a 17-yard score with 37 seconds remaining. The Seahawks' final drive petered out and the Cowboys had the stunning 43–39 win.

Week 14: at Minnesota Vikings

The Seahawks rallied to beat the Vikings 27–23 on 334 yards and three touchdowns by Hasselbeck and 112 more rushing yards from Shaun Alexander. Darrell Jackson competed despite learning on game morning that his father had died; he caught ten passes for 135 yards and a go-ahead touchdown.

Week 15: at New York Jets

Matt Hasselbeck managed two touchdowns in the first half but the game collapsed as the NY Jets scored 24 points in the first half then shut out the Seahawks while adding two more Chad Pennington touchdowns, marred by a missed PAT. Curtis Martin rushed for 134 yards and two scores, outpacing the entire Seahawks backfield (88 rushing yards).

Week 16: vs. Arizona Cardinals

Shaun Alexander accounted for 154 yards and all three Seahawks touchdowns as Seattle returned to Qwest Field and edged the five-win Cardinals 24–21. Trent Dilfer subbed for Hasselbeck but managed only 128 passing yards.

Week 17: vs. Atlanta Falcons

The Seahawks clinched the NFC West by erasing a 17–7 Falcons lead to win 28–26.
 It was the second time in three seasons the Falcons made the playoffs despite losing the regular-season finale.

Postseason

Seattle entered the postseason as the #4 seed in the NFC.

NFC Wild Card Playoff: vs. #5 St. Louis Rams

References

External links
 Seahawks draft history at NFL.com
 2004 NFL season results at NFL.com

Seattle
NFC West championship seasons
Seattle Seahawks seasons
Seattle Seahawks